Naramalli Sivaprasad  (10 June 1951 – 21 September 2019) was an Indian film actor turned politician, belonging to Telugu Desam Party. In the 2009 election he was elected to the Lok Sabha from the Chittoor constituency in Andhra Pradesh. He dressed himself up in many roles in protesting against the bifurcation of Andhra Pradesh state. He was also one of the MPs who were suspended for protesting in Indian Parliament against the bifurcation of the state.
He also protested by dressing himself up as B. R. Ambedkar demanding special status for Andhra Pradesh.

Filmography

Actor
Software Sudheer (2019)
Sye Aata
 Balakrishnudu (2017)
Sapthagiri LLB (2017)
Software Sudheer (2019)
Doosukeltha (2014)
Ayyare (2012)
Pilla Zamindar (2011)
Thakita Thakita (2010)
Brahma Lokam to Yama Lokam via Bhu lokam (2010)
Maska (2009)	
Drona (2009)		
Kuberulu (2008)	
Baladur (2008)
Aatadista (2008)
Okka Magaadu (2008)
Tulasi (2007)	
Kithakithalu (2006)
Pelliki mundu Prema katha (2019)	
Lakshmi (2006)
Danger (2005)
Jai Chiranjeeva (2005)
Baalu ABCDEFG (2005)
Yem poillo Yem pillado
Aadhilakshmi
YamaGola malli modalaindi
Subhas Chandra Bose
Sathyabhama
Aadivaram Aadavallaku Selavu
 Atadistha
Madam (1993)
Master Kapuram (1990)
Yamudiki Mogudu (1988)
Khaidi (1983)

Director
 Prema Thapasu
 Topi Raja Sweety Roja
 Illalu
 Kokkarokko

Awards
 Nandi Award for Best Villain - Danger (2005)

References

External links
Official biographical sketch in Parliament of India website

India MPs 2009–2014
1951 births
2019 deaths
Nandi Award winners
Lok Sabha members from Andhra Pradesh
People from Chittoor district
People from Rayalaseema
India MPs 2014–2019
Telugu Desam Party politicians
Telugu politicians